Zastocze may refer to the following places:
Zastocze, Lublin Voivodeship (east Poland)
Zastocze, Masovian Voivodeship (east-central Poland)
Zastocze, Podlaskie Voivodeship (north-east Poland)